Prinses Irenebuurt is a neighborhood of Amsterdam, Netherlands.

Neighbourhoods of Amsterdam
Amsterdam-Zuid